The following lists events that happened during 1863 in New Zealand.

Incumbents

Regal and viceregal
Head of State — Queen Victoria
Governor — Sir George Grey

Government and law
The 3rd New Zealand Parliament continues.

Speaker of the House — David Monro
Premier — Frederick Whitaker replaces Alfred Domett on 30 October after Domett loses a vote of no-confidence.
Minister of Finance — Reader Wood
Chief Justice — Hon Sir George Arney

Events
 1 January: The Colonist ceases publishing and is absorbed into the Daily Telegraph. It began as the Otago Colonist in 1856.
 7 February: HMS Orpheus is wrecked at the entrance to Manukau Harbour with the loss of 189 lives.
 1 May: The Evening Star, a Dunedin newspaper, publishes its first issue. The paper continued until 1979.
 July: The beginning of the Invasion of Waikato under Duncan Alexander Cameron.
 July: Heavy snowfalls followed by warm rains cause sudden and extensive flooding in Central Otago, destroying numerous gold mining camps. It is estimated that at least 100 miners died in the floods and the preceding snowstorm.
 November: Shortly after his government loses a vote of no-confidence, former Premier Alfred Domett moves a resolution in Parliament that the Capital of New Zealand be moved closer to Cook Strait. This leads to the movement of the Capital to Wellington in 1865.
 13 November: The New Zealand Herald publishes its first issue. The Auckland-based newspaper continues to publish .
 Otago Gold Rush (1861–63)

Undated
The Government-sponsored Māori language magazine Te Manuhiri Tuarangi and Maori Intelligencer ceases publication. It started in 1861, but predecessors were published from 1842.
 The Government starts printing a Māori language newspaper, Te Pihoihoi Mokemoke, to combat the views expressed by the Māori King Movement's newspaper Te Hokioi o Nui-Tireni e Rere atu ra. After the fifth issue was published, the press was seized by Ngāti Maniapoto in one of several incidents which led to the Invasion of Waikato. Later in the year Te Hokioi o Nui-Tireni e Rere atu ra, which started in 1861, also ceased publication.
 A town board is established in Wellington with three wards (Thorndon, Lambton and Te Aro) but no mayor.

Arts and literature

Music
One of the earliest recorded visits by an opera singer to New Zealand is made by Australian Marie Carandini.

Sport

Horse racing

Major race winner
New Zealand Derby winner: Azucena

Shooting
Ballinger Belt: Lieutenant Owen (Wanganui)

Births
 27 April (in India): Henry Braddon, rugby union player.
 8 August: Robert Wright, mayor of Wellington and politician.
 3 November: Thomas William "Torpedo Billy" Murphy, boxing world title holder.

Unknown date
 Annette Paul, salvation army officer
 George Pearce (in England), member of parliament

Deaths

 2 February: Te Matenga Taiaroa, tribal leader
 10 April: David MacNish, interpreter, labourer, bricklayer, farmer and Pākehā Māori
 8 November: Nuka Taipari, tribal leader, warrior and tohunga

Unknown date
Matiu Parakatone Tahu, tribal tohunga and mission teacher (died in late 1863 or early 1864)

See also
List of years in New Zealand
Timeline of New Zealand history
History of New Zealand
Military history of New Zealand
Timeline of the New Zealand environment
Timeline of New Zealand's links with Antarctica

References
General
 Romanos, J. (2001) New Zealand Sporting Records and Lists. Auckland: Hodder Moa Beckett. 
Specific

External links